This page provides an index of articles on rail transport by country.

International railway organisations 
 International Union of Railways (UIC)
 International Union of Public Transport (UITP)
 Association of American Railways  (AAR)

Africa

Eastern Africa 

 : see Rail transport in Djibouti
 : see Rail transport in Eritrea
 : see Rail transport in Ethiopia
 : see Rail transport in Kenya
 : see Rail transport in Madagascar
 : see Rail transport in Malawi
 : see Rail transport in Mauritius
 : see Mozambique Ports and Railways
 : see Transport in Réunion
 : see Rail transport in Rwanda
 : see Transport in Seychelles
 : see Rail transport in Somalia
 : see Rail transport in South Sudan
 : see Rail transport in Tanzania
 : see Rail transport in Uganda
 : see Rail transport in Zambia
 : see Rail transport in Zimbabwe

Middle Africa 
 : see Rail transport in Angola
 : see Rail transport in Cameroon
 : see Transport in the Central African Republic
 : see Rail transport in Chad
 : see Rail transport in the Democratic Republic of the Congo
 : see Rail transport in the Republic of the Congo
 : see Rail transport in Equatorial Guinea
 : see Rail transport in Gabon
 : see Transport in São Tomé and Príncipe

Northern Africa 
 : see Rail transport in Algeria and SNTF
 : see Rail transport in Egypt
 : see Rail transport in Libya
 : see Rail transport in Morocco
 : see Rail transport in Sudan
 : see Rail transport in Tunisia
 : see Transport in Western Sahara

Southern Africa 
 : see Rail transport in Botswana
 : see Eswatini Railways
 : see Rail transport in Lesotho
 : see Rail transport in Namibia
 : see Rail transport in South Africa

Western Africa 
 : see Rail transport in Benin
 : see Rail transport in Burkina Faso
 : There is no rail transport in Cape Verde.
 : see Rail transport in Côte d'Ivoire
 : see Transport in The Gambia
 : see Rail transport in Ghana
 : see Rail transport in Guinea
 : see Transport in Guinea-Bissau
 : see Railways in Liberia
 : see Rail transport in Mali
 : see Rail transport in Mauritania
 : see Rail transport in Niger
 : see Rail transport in Nigeria
 : see Transport on Saint Helena
 : see Rail transport in Senegal
 : see Rail transport in Sierra Leone
 : see Rail transport in Togo

Asia

East Asia 
 : see Rail transport in China
 : see Rail transport in Hong Kong
 : see Rail transport in Japan
 : see Rail transport in Macau
 : see Rail transport in Mongolia
 : see Rail transport in North Korea
 : see Rail transport in South Korea
 : see Rail transport in Taiwan

Central Asia 
 : see Rail transport in Kazakhstan
 : see Rail transport in Kyrgyzstan
 : see Rail transport in Tajikistan
 : see Rail transport in Turkmenistan
 : see Rail transport in Uzbekistan

South Asia 
 : see Rail transport in Afghanistan
 : see Rail transport in Bangladesh
 : see Rail transport in Bhutan
 : see Rail transport in the British Indian Ocean Territory
 : see Rail transport in India
 : see Rail transport in Nepal
 : see Rail transport in Pakistan
 : see Rail transport in Sri Lanka

Southeast Asia 
 : see Rail transport in Brunei
 : see Rail transport in Cambodia
 : see Rail transport in East Timor
 : see Rail transport in Indonesia
 : see Rail transport in Laos
 : see Rail transport in Malaysia
 : see Rail transport in Myanmar
 : see Rail transportation in the Philippines
 : see Rail transport in Singapore
 : see Rail transport in Thailand
 : see Rail transport in Vietnam

Western Asia 
 : see Rail transport in Abkhazia
 : see Rail transport in Armenia
 : see Rail transport in Azerbaijan
 : see Rail transport in Bahrain
 : see Cyprus Government Railway
 : see Rail transport in Georgia
 : see Rail transport in Iran
 : see Rail transport in Iraq
 : see Rail transport in Israel 
 : see Rail transport in Jordan
 : see Rail transport in Kuwait
 : see Rail transport in Lebanon
 : see Cyprus Government Railway
 : see Rail transport in Oman
 : see Rail transport in Palestine
 : see Rail transport in Qatar
 : see Rail transport in Saudi Arabia
 : see Rail transport in Syria
 : see Rail transport in Turkey
 : see Rail transport in the United Arab Emirates
 : see Rail transport in Yemen

Europe

Eastern Europe 
 : see Rail transport in Albania
 : see Rail transport in Belarus
 : see Rail transport in Bosnia and Herzegovina
 : see Rail transport in Bulgaria
 : see Rail transport in Croatia
 : see Rail transport in the Czech Republic and České dráhy
 : see Rail transport in Estonia
 : see Rail transport in Hungary and MÁV
 : see Rail transport in Kosovo
 : see Rail transport in Latvia
 : see Rail transport in Lithuania
 : see Rail transport in Moldova
 : see Railways of Montenegro
 : see Rail transport in North Macedonia
 : see Rail transport in Poland and PKP
 : see Rail transport in Romania and CFR
 : see Rail transport in Russia
 : see Rail transport in Serbia
 : see Rail transport in Slovakia
 : see Rail transport in Slovenia
 : see Rail transport in Ukraine

Northern Europe 
 : see Rail transport in Denmark and Danske Statsbaner
 : see Rail transport in Finland
 : see Rail transport in Iceland
 : see Rail transport in Norway and Vy
 : see Rail transport in Ireland
 : see Rail transport in Sweden and SJ AB
 : see Rail transport in United Kingdom and Commuter rail in the United Kingdom
 For Great Britain: see Rail transport in Great Britain
 For Northern Ireland: see Rail transport in Ireland
 : see Rail transport in the Isle of Man

Southern Europe 
 : see Rail transport in Andorra
 : see Cyprus Government Railway
 : see Hellenic Train, Railways of Greece and Hellenic Railways Organisation
 : see Rail transport in Italy and Trenitalia
 : see Malta Railway
 : see Rail transport in Portugal, Comboios de Portugal and Infraestruturas dePortugal
 : see Rail transport in Spain
 : see Rail transport in Vatican City

Western Europe 
 : see Rail transport in Austria and Austrian Federal Railways
 : see Rail transport in Belgium or NMBS/SNCB or Infrabel
 : see Rail transport in France or SNCF
 : see Rail transport in Germany and Deutsche Bahn
 : see Rail transport in Liechtenstein
 : see Rail transport in Luxembourg
 : see Rail transport in Monaco
 : see Rail transport in the Netherlands, Trains in the Netherlands and Nederlandse Spoorwegen
 : see Rail transport in Switzerland

North America

Caribbean 
 : See Rail transport in Antigua and Barbuda
 : See Rail transport in the Bahamas
 : See Rail transport in Barbados
 : see Rail transport in Bermuda,  private automobiles were not allowed.
 : See Rail transport in Cuba
 : See Rail transport in Dominica
 : See Rail transport in the Dominican Republic
 : See Rail transport in Grenada
 : See Rail transport in Haiti
 : See Rail transport in Jamaica
 : see Rail transport in Puerto Rico
 : See Rail transport in Saint Kitts and Nevis
 : See Rail transport in Saint Lucia
 : See Rail transport in Saint Vincent and the Grenadines
 : See Transport in Trinidad and Tobago

Central America 

 : see Rail transport in Belize
 : see Rail transport in Costa Rica
 : see Rail transport in El Salvador
 : see Rail transport in Guatemala
 : see Rail transport in Honduras
 : see Rail transport in Nicaragua
 : see Rail transport in Panama

Northern America 
 : see Rail transport in Canada
 : see Rail transportation in the United States
 : see Rail transport in Mexico

Oceania 
 : see Rail transport in Australia 
 : see Rail transport in Nauru
 : see Rail transport in Fiji
 : see Rail transport in New Zealand
Railways also existed in New Caledonia, Makatea, New Guinea, Saipan and Banaba.

South America 
 : see  Rail transport in Argentina
 : see Rail transport in Bolivia
 : see Rail transport in Brazil
 : see Rail transport in Chile
 : see Rail transport in Colombia
 : see Rail transport in Ecuador
 : see Transport in French Guiana
 : see Transport in Guyana
 : see Rail transport in Paraguay
 : see Rail transport in Peru
 : see Transport in Suriname
 : see Rail transport in Uruguay
 : see Rail transport in Venezuela
 : see Camber Railway for former railway

See also

High-speed rail
 List of countries by rail transport network size
 List of countries by rail usage
 Railway coupling by country
 List of locomotive builders
 List of railway companies
 List of rolling stock manufacturers
 List of track gauges
 List of tram manufacturers
 Transportation engineering
 Rail transport

References

Further reading
 Nock, O. S. Steam railways in retrospect (1966) online
 Nock, O. S. Railways at the zenith of steam, 1920-40 (1970) online
 Nock, O. S. Railways in the years of preeminence 1905-1919 (1971) online
 Nock, O. S. Railways in the formative years, 1851-1895 (1973) online
 Nock, O. S. Railways in the transition from steam, 1940-1965  (1974) online
 Nock, O. S. Railways then and now: a world history  (1975) online
 Nock, O. S. Railways of Western Europe  (1977) online
 Nock, O. S. Encyclopedia of Railways  (1977)
 Nock, O. S. World atlas of railways   (1978) online
 Nock, O. S. Railways of the USA (1979) online
 Nock, O. S. 150 years of main line railways  (1980) online